The Order of Newfoundland and Labrador is a civilian honour for merit in the Canadian province of Newfoundland and Labrador. Instituted in 2001, when Lieutenant Governor Arthur Maxwell House granted Royal Assent to the Order of Newfoundland and Labrador Act, the order is administered by the Governor-in-Council and is intended to honour current or former Newfoundland and Labrador residents for conspicuous achievements in any field, being thus described as the highest honour amongst all others conferred by the Newfoundland and Labrador Crown.

Structure and appointment
The Order of Newfoundland and Labrador is intended to honour any current or former longtime resident of Newfoundland and Labrador who has demonstrated a high level of individual excellence and achievement in any field, having "demonstrated excellence and achievement in any field of endeavour benefiting in an outstanding manner Newfoundland and Labrador and its residents." There are no limits on how many can belong to the order, though inductions are limited to eight per year; Canadian citizenship is a requirement, and those who are elected or appointed members of a governmental body are ineligible as long as they hold office.

The process of finding qualified individuals begins with submissions from the public to the Secretary of the Order of Newfoundland and Labrador Advisory Council, which consists of the Clerk of the Executive Council and five persons appointed by the lieutenant governor: two Members of the Order of Newfoundland and Labrador and four other individuals. This committee then meets at least once annually to make its selected recommendations to the Executive Council and works with that body in narrowing down the potential appointees to a list that will be submitted to the lieutenant governor; posthumous nominations are not accepted, though an individual who dies after his or her name was submitted to the Advisory Council can still be retroactively made a Member of the Order of Newfoundland and Labrador. Further, anyone not meeting the requirements of admission may be invested as an honorary Member. The lieutenant governor, ex officio a Member and the Chancellor of the Order of Newfoundland and Labrador, then makes all appointments into the fellowship's single grade of membership by an Order in Council that bears the viceroyal sign-manual and the Great Seal of the province; thereafter, the new Members are entitled to use the post-nominal letters ONL.

Insignia
Upon admission into the Order of Newfoundland and Labrador, usually in a ceremony held at Government House in St. John's, new Members are presented with the order's insignia. The main badge consists of a gold medallion in the form of a stylized sarracenia purpurea (or purple pitcher plant)—the official provincial flower—with the obverse in marbleized green enamel with gold edging, and bearing at its centre the escutcheon of the arms of Newfoundland and Labrador, all surmounted by a St. Edward's Crown symbolizing the Canadian monarch's role as the fount of honour. The ribbon is patterned with vertical stripes in blue, white, and two shades of green; men wear the medallion suspended from this ribbon at the collar, while women carry theirs on a ribbon bow at the left chest. Members also receive a lapel pin that can be worn during less formal occasions.

Inductees
The following are some notable appointees of the Order of Newfoundland and Labrador:

 Michael B. Adam , gold medal Olympian, appointed 2006
 Edgar Albert Baird , businessman, appointed 2004
 Tom Dawe , writer, appointed 2012
 Donald B. Dingwell , scientist, appointed 2021
 Jane Green, geneticist, appointed 2013
 Gary Graham , musician, appointed 2004
 Bradley Raymond Gushue , gold medal Olympian, appointed 2006
 Russell W. Howard , gold medal Olympian, appointed 2006
 Paul Jolliffe Johnson , businessman and philanthropist, appointed 2004
 Jamie A. Korab , gold medal Olympian, appointed 2006
 Hazel Newhook, politician, appointed 2009
 Mark Nichols , gold medal Olympian, appointed 2006
 Paul O'Neill , author and producer, appointed 2007
 Kaetlyn Osmond , Olympic and World Champion figure skater, appointed 2019.
 Lanier W. Phillips, (honorary) for his work opposing discrimination and oppression, appointed 2011.  (In 1942 local residents rescued Lanier from a shipwreck on the Newfoundland coast.)  
 Christopher Pratt , artist, appointed 2018
 Philip Riteman , an Auschwitz survivor, appointed 2016
 Edward Moxon Roberts , former Lieutenant Governor of Newfoundland and Labrador, appointed 2004
 Geoff Stirling, businessman, appointed 2009
 James A. Tuck , archaeologist, appointed 2004
 Otto Tucker , cultural historian, appointed 2004
 Clyde Wells , fifth Premier of Newfoundland and Labrador, appointed 2016

See also
 Canadian order of precedence (decorations and medals)
 Symbols of Newfoundland and Labrador
 State decoration

References

External links
 Order of Newfoundland and Labrador webpage

Provincial and territorial orders of Canada
Newfoundland and Labrador awards
Provincial symbols of Newfoundland and Labrador